Frank Fredrick George Elliott ( 23 July 1929 – November 2018) was a Welsh former footballer who played in the Football League for Fulham, Mansfield Town and Stoke City.

Career
Elliott was born in Lambeth and began his career with Merthyr Tydfil and then Swansea Town before he joined Stoke City in 1952. He provided back up to Bill Robertson and Dennis Herod making 13 appearances in 1952–53 and ten in 1953–54 before leaving for Fulham in March 1954. He spent three seasons at Craven Cottage and then moved to Mansfield Town where he spent two seasons making 69 appearances and later played for non-league Bath City.

Career statistics
Source:

References

Welsh footballers
Stoke City F.C. players
Fulham F.C. players
Mansfield Town F.C. players
English Football League players
1929 births
2018 deaths
Association football goalkeepers